Temple Sons of Israel is a synagogue in Sydney, Nova Scotia. It is the only active synagogue in Cape Breton. The congregation was established in 1919.

References

External links
 Official website
 
 
 

Buildings and structures in the Cape Breton Regional Municipality
20th-century synagogues
Synagogues in Nova Scotia
Conservative synagogues in Canada
20th-century religious buildings and structures in Canada